Christine Harnos (born November 16, 1968) is a Canadian actress and co-founder of the circus outreach organization Circus Remedy.

Career

Acting
Harnos portrayed Jennifer Greene, the first wife of main character Mark Greene on ER (1994–2002), Josie Ray in Remembering Sex (1998), Dotty from The Girl Gets Moe (1997), Rimmer in the action-horror film Hellraiser: Bloodline (1996), Kaye Faulkner in Dazed and Confused (1993), Linda Wyatt in Judgement Night (1993), Sarah Hughes in Cold Dog Soup (1990), and Sid in Denial (1990).

Child development
In 2003, Harnos left acting to pursue a degree in child development at Mills College. In 2006, she helped co-create the circus outreach organization Circus Remedy with Anthony Lucero and Terry Notary. She served as executive director as of 2016.

Filmography

References

External links
 
 
 

1968 births
Actresses from Toronto
Living people
Canadian television actresses
Canadian film actresses
20th-century Canadian actresses
21st-century Canadian actresses